Shibazaki (written: 柴崎) is a Japanese surname. Notable people with the surname include:

, Imperial Japanese Navy admiral
, Japanese footballer

Japanese-language surnames